Transcription factor Jun is a protein that in humans is encoded by the JUN gene. c-Jun, in combination with protein c-Fos, forms the AP-1 early response transcription factor. It was first identified as the Fos-binding protein p39 and only later rediscovered as the product of the JUN gene. c-jun was the first oncogenic transcription factor discovered. The proto-oncogene c-Jun is the cellular homolog of the viral oncoprotein v-jun. The viral homolog v-jun was discovered in avian sarcoma virus 17 and was named for ju-nana, the Japanese word for 17. The human JUN encodes a protein that is highly similar to the viral protein, which interacts directly with specific target DNA sequences to regulate gene expression. This gene is intronless and is mapped to 1p32-p31, a chromosomal region involved in both translocations and deletions in human malignancies.

Function

Regulation 

Both Jun and its dimerization partners in AP-1 formation are subject to regulation by diverse extracellular stimuli, which include peptide growth factors, pro-inflammatory cytokines, oxidative and other forms of cellular stress, and UV irradiation. For example, UV irradiation is a potent inducer for elevated c-jun expression.

c-jun transcription is autoregulated by its own product, Jun. The binding of Jun (AP-1) to a high-affinity AP-1 binding site in the jun promoter region induces jun transcription. This positive autoregulation by stimulating its own transcription may be a mechanism for prolonging the signals from extracellular stimuli. This mechanism can have biological significance for the activity of c-jun in cancer.

Also, the c-jun activities can be regulated by the ERK pathway. Constitutively active ERK is found to increase c-jun transcription and stability through CREB and GSK3. This results in activated c-jun and its downstream targets such as RACK1 and cyclin D1. RACK1 can enhance JNK activity, and activated JNK signaling subsequently exerts regulation on c-jun activity.

It is activated through double phosphorylation by the JNK pathway but has also a phosphorylation-independent function. c-jun knockout is lethal, but transgenic animals with a mutated c-jun that cannot be phosphorylated (termed c-junAA) can survive.

Phosphorylation of Jun at serines 63 and 73 and threonine 91 and 93 increases transcription of the c-jun target genes. Therefore, regulation of c-jun activity can be achieved through N-terminal phosphorylation by the Jun N-terminal kinases (JNKs). It is shown that Jun’s activity (AP-1 activity) in stress-induced apoptosis and cellular proliferation is regulated by its N-terminal phosphorylation. Another study showed that oncogenic transformation by ras and fos also requires Jun N-terminal phosphorylation at Serine 63 and 73.

Cell cycle progression

Studies have shown that c-jun is required for progression through the G1 phase of the cell cycle, and c-jun null cells show increased G1 arrest. C-jun regulates the transcriptional level of cyclin D1, which is a major Rb kinase. Rb is a growth suppressor, and it is inactivated by phosphorylation. Therefore, c-jun is required for maintaining sufficient cyclin D1 kinase activity and allowing cell cycle progression.

In cells absent of c-jun, the expression of p53 (cell cycle arrest inducer) and p21 (CDK inhibitor and p53 target gene) is increased, and those cells exhibit cell cycle defects. Overexpression of c-jun in cells results in decreased level of p53 and p21, and exhibits accelerated cell proliferation. C-jun represses p53 transcription by binding to a variant AP-1 site in the p53 promoter. Those results indicate that c-jun downregulates p53 to control cell cycle progression.

Anti-apoptotic activity 

UV irradiation can activate c-jun expression and the JNK signaling pathway. C-jun protects cells from UV-induced apoptosis, and it cooperates with NF-κB to prevent apoptosis induced by TNFα. The protection from apoptosis by c-jun requires serines 63/73 (involved in phosphorylation of Jun), which is not required in c-jun-mediated G1 progress. This suggests that c-jun regulates cell cycle progression and apoptosis through two separated mechanisms.

A study utilized liver-specific inactivation of c-jun in hepatocellular carcinoma, which showed impaired tumor development correlated with increased level of p53 protein and the mRNA level of the p53 target gene noxa. Also, c-jun can protect hepatocytes from apoptosis, as hepatocytes lacking c-jun showed increased sensitivity to TNFα-induced apoptosis. In those hepatocytes lacking c-jun, deletion of p53 can restore resistance toward TNFα. Those results indicate that c-jun antagonizes the proapoptotic activity of p53 in liver tumor.

Clinical significance 

It is known that c-jun plays a role in cellular proliferation and apoptosis of the endometrium throughout the menstrual cycle. The cyclic change of the c-jun protein levels is significant in the proliferation and apoptosis of glandular epithelial cells. The persistent stromal expression of c-jun protein may prevent stromal cells from entering into apoptosis during the late secretory phase.

Cancer 

In a study using non-small cell lung cancers (NSCLC), c-jun was found to be overexpressed in 31% of the cases in primary and metastatic lung tumors, whereas normal conducting airway and alveolar epithelia in general did not express c-jun.

A study with a group consisted of 103 cases of phase I/II invasive breast cancers showed that activated c-jun is expressed predominantly at the invasive front of breast cancer and is associated with proliferation and angiogenesis.

Tumor initiation 

A study was done with liver-specific inactivation of c-jun at different stages of tumor development in mice with chemically induced hepatocellular carcinomas. The result indicates that c-jun is required at the early stage of tumor development, and deletion of c-jun can largely suppress tumor formation. Also, c-jun is required for tumor cell survival between the initiation and progression stages. In contrast to that, inactivation of c-jun in advanced tumors does not impair tumor progression.

Breast cancer 

Overexpression of c-jun in MCF-7 cells can result in overall increased aggressiveness, as shown by increased cellular motility, increased expression of a matrix-degrading enzyme MMP-9, increased in vitro chemoinvasion, and tumor formation in nude mice in the absence of exogenous estrogens. The MCF-7 cells with c-jun overexpression became unresponsive to estrogen and tamoxifen, thus c-jun overexpression is proposed to lead to an estrogen-independent phenotype in breast cancer cells. The observed phenotype for MCF-7 cells with c-jun overexpression is similar to that observed clinically in advanced breast cancer, which had become hormone unresponsive.

The invasive phenotype contributed by c-jun overexpression is confirmed in another study. In addition, this study showed increased in vivo liver metastasis by the breast cancer with c-jun overexpression. This finding suggests that c-jun plays a critical role in the metastasis of breast cancer.

In mammary tumors, endogenous c-jun was found to play a key role in ErbB2-induced migration and invasion of mammary epithelial cells. Jun transcriptionally activates the promoters of SCF (stem cell factor) and CCL5. The induced SCF and CCL5 expression promotes a self-renewing mammary epithelial population. It suggests that c-jun mediates the expansion of breast cancer stem cells to enhance tumor invasiveness.

Vulvar cancer 

C-jun has been observed overexpressed in Vulvar Squamous Cell Carcinoma samples, in association with hypermethylation-Induced inactivation of the RARB tumor suppressor gene. Indeed, mRNA levels of c-Jun tested higher in Vulvar cancer samples when compared with those of normal skin and preneoplastic vulvar lesions, thus underscoring a cross-link between RARB gene and the oncogene c-Jun.

Cellular differentiation 

Ten undifferentiated and highly aggressive sarcomas showed amplification of the jun gene and JUN overexpression at both RNA and protein levels. Overexpression of c-jun in 3T3-L1 cells (a preadipocytic non-tumoral cell line that resembles human liposarcoma) can block or delay adipocytic differentiation of those cells.

Nerve and spinal cord regeneration 
Peripheral nerve injury in rodents rapidly activates JNK signaling which in turn activates c-Jun. In contrast, nerve injury in the central nervous system does not. c-Jun is sufficient to promote axon regeneration in both the peripheral and central nervous systems as overexpression in both dorsal root ganglion neurons and cortical neurons leads to increased regeneration.

As anti-cancer drug target 

Since c-jun has been observed overexpressed in cancer, several studies highlighted the hypothesis that this gene might be a target for cancer therapy. A study showed that oncogenic transformation by ras and fos requires Jun N-terminal phosphorylation at Serine 63 and 73 by the Jun N- terminal kinases (JNK). In this study, the induced skin tumor and osteosarcoma showed impaired development in mice with a mutant Jun incapable of N-terminal phosphorylation. Also, in a mouse model of intestinal cancer, genetic abrogation of Jun N-terminal phosphorylation or gut-specific c-jun inactivation attenuated cancer development and prolonged lifespan. Therefore, targeting the N-terminal phosphorylation of Jun (or the JNK signaling pathway) can be a potential strategy for inhibiting tumor growth.

In melanoma-derived B16-F10 cancer cells, c-jun inactivation by a pharmacological JNK/jun inhibitor SP combined with JunB knockdown can result in cytotoxic effect, leading to cell arrest and apoptosis. This anti-JunB /Jun strategy can increase the survival of mice inoculated with tumor cells, which suggests a potential antitumor strategy through Jun and JunB inhibition.

Anti-cancer property of c-jun
Most research results show that c-jun contributes to tumor initiation and increased invasiveness. However, a few studies discovered some alternative activities of c-jun, suggesting that c-jun may actually be a double-edge sword in cancer.

p16 
p16INK4a is a tumor suppressor and a cell cycle inhibitor, and a study shows that c-jun acts as “bodyguard” to p16INK4a by preventing methylation of the p16INK4a promoter. Therefore, c-jun can prevent silencing of the gene p16INK4a.

Tylophorine 
Tylophorine is a type of plant-derived alkaloid with anticancer activity by inducing cell cycle arrest. A study demonstrated that tylophorine treatment increased c-jun protein accumulation. Then c-jun expression in conjunction with tylophorine promotes G1 arrest in carcinoma cells through the downregulation of cyclin A2. Therefore, the result indicates that the anticancer mechanism of tylophorine is mediated through c-jun.

Interactions 
C-jun has been shown to interact with:

 ATF2 
 AR 
 ASCC3 
 ATF3 
 BCL3 
 BCL6 
 BRCA1 
 C-Fos 
 CSNK2A1 
 COPS5 
 CREBBP 
 CSNK2A2 
 DDX21, 
 DDIT3 
 ERG 
 ETS2, 
 FOSL1 
 GTF2B
 MAPK8 
 MyoD 
 NACA 
 NELFB 
 NFE2L1 
 NFE2L2 
 NCOR2 
 NCOA1 
 PIN1 
 RBM39 
 RELA 
 RB1 
 RFWD2 
 RUNX1
 RUNX2 
 SMAD3 
 STAT1 
 STAT3 
 TBP
 TGIF1

See also 
 c-Jun N-terminal kinases

References

Further reading

External links 
 
 
 Drosophila Jun-related antigen - The Interactive Fly